The Battle of Achelous took place in 1359 near the river Achelous, in Aetolia, modern Greece fought between Albanian troops, under Peter Losha and John Spata, and forces of the Despotate of Epirus, under Nikephoros II Orsini. The Albanians defeated Orsini's army, which suffered massive casualties during the battle. The battle established two despotates from regions previously part of the Despotate of Epirus: the Despotate of Arta and the Despotate of Angelokastron and Lepanto.

Prelude 
Since the early 14th century the power of the Despotate of Epirus had been decreasing while the Albanian tribesmen had been increasing their control over many areas of the despotate. Nikephoros II Orsini, Despot of Epirus decided to establish closer relations to the Serbian Empire by dropping his previous wife Maria Cantacuzena and marrying the sister of Stefan Uroš IV Dušan's widow. The Albanians of the Despotate threatened revolt if Orsini married Helena of Bulgaria's sister and didn't recall Maria, who was part of the Kantakouzenos family allied with them. Orsini was forced to recall Maria but decided to wage war against the Albanians to stop their increasing power in the despotate.

Battle 
Nikephoros II Orsini gathered his forces and marched against the Albanians in the regions they had settled in Aetolia, modern western Greece. The Albanians gathered their forces and under the leadership of Peter Losha fought against Orsini in the late spring of 1359 near the Achelous river. The Albanians won the battle. Orsini was killed and his whole army was destroyed.

Aftermath 
After Nikephoros's death the remaining major towns in the Despotate of Epirus, being under risk of capture by the Albanian troops, submitted to Simeon Uroš and the remaining areas of the Despotate were divided between him and Radoslav Hlapen. Simeon, unable to expel the Albanian leaders, tried to maintain indirect control of Epirus by recognizing Peter Losha and John Spata as despots, in the regions of Arta and Angelokastron and Lepanto respectively.

Although most of Epirus came temporary under Albanian rule, due to their tribal structure and lack of central authority the Albanians didn't replace any existing Greek or Serbian rule with a centralized Albanian state. As an aftermath by 1366-67 only the city of Ioannina wasn't under Albanian control.

Sources 

Battles involving Albania
14th century in Greece
Battles involving the Despotate of Epirus
Conflicts in 1359
1359 in Europe
History of Aetolia-Acarnania
Achelous River
Medieval Epirus